= Sabita Tamilini =

Indian politician

Sabitha Tamilini is a Doctorate in Social Work and politician of Tamil Nadu. She is the Tamil Nadu State president of All India Trinamool Congress. She is also the Pondicherry Union Territory in-charge of the party.
